Anti-Hero is a collaborative studio album by Slaine and Termanology. It was released on October 6, 2017, through Termanology's own record label, ST. Records and Boston based label, Brick Records.

Background
The album includes guest appearances from Bun B, Catero, Chris Rivers, Conway, DJ Revolution, Ea$y Money, Everlast, Ill Bill, Jared Evan, Madchild, Nems, Ras Kass, and Sick Jacken. The album features production from Artisin, Billy Loman, DC The Midi Alien, DJ Premier, Evidence, Psycho Les, Statik Selektah, Termanology and The Arcitype.

Singles
On August 22, 2017, the first single from the album, "Land Of The Lost" was released as well as the music video.
On September 12, 2017, they released the second single "Came A Long Way" featuring Conway. The official music video for the single was released on November 1, 2016.

Track listing

Notes
  signifies a co-producer

References

2017 albums
Termanology albums
Slaine (rapper) albums
Albums produced by DJ Premier
Albums produced by Evidence (musician)
Albums produced by Statik Selektah
Albums produced by the Beatnuts